Xiong Yuan may refer to:

Jia'ao, king of Chu (r. 544–541 BC), personal name Xiong Yuan (熊員)
King Kaolie of Chu (r. 262–238 BC), personal name Xiong Yuan (熊元)